Auto is an unincorporated community in Greenbrier County, West Virginia, United States.

A post office called Auto has been in operation since 1911. The community is said to have been named for horse and buggies (previously called "automobiles") in the area.

References

Unincorporated communities in Greenbrier County, West Virginia
Unincorporated communities in West Virginia